Paolo Maria Jannacci (born 5 September 1972) is an Italian singer, pianist and composer.

He is the son of singer-songwriter Enzo Jannacci.

Jannacci participated at the Sanremo Music Festival 2020 with the song "Voglio parlarti adesso".

Discography

Studio albums 
 Notes (2002)
 Tape 1 (2004)
 Paolo Jannacci Trio (2008)
 Allegra (2013)
 Hard Playing (2017)
 Canterò (2019)

References

External links
 

Italian jazz singers
Italian jazz pianists
Italian composers
Italian pop singers
Living people
Musicians from Milan
21st-century Italian male  singers
1972 births